Mimela junii is a species of shining leaf chafer belonging to the family Scarabaeidae subfamily Rutelinae.

These scarabs are mainly present in Austria, France, Italy and Switzerland.

The head, pronotum and the inner margin of elytra are metallic-green, antennae are reddish, while elytra are coppery-brown, with longitudinal darker stripes.

The adults can be encountered from June (hence the Latin word junii) through July on flowers, especially on elder flowers (Sambucus species).

The adults beetles mainly feed on leaves of various wild shrubs and grasses, while larvae prefer sandy soils and are rhizophagous, feeding on roots at the expense of psammophilous and herbaceous plants or on decaying vegetables.

Subspecies
Mimela junii var. calabrica Machatschke, 1952
Mimela junii var. gigliocola Machatschke, 1952
Mimela junii var. junii (Duftschmid, 1805)
Mimela junii var. rugosula (Fairmaire, 1859

External links
 Biolib
 Fauna Europaea
 Parco Abruzzo

Rutelinae
Beetles of Europe
Beetles described in 1805